The men's javelin throw competition at the 2016 Summer Olympics in Rio de Janeiro, Brazil. The event was held at the Olympic Stadium between August 17–20.

Summary
Defending champion, Keshorn Walcott started the final with a respectable 83.45 m.  The second thrower was Johannes Vetter who topped it with an 85.32 m.  The eighth thrower in the round was reigning World Champion Julius Yego, who tossed it , landing on his hands to avoid a face plant on the runway.  He moved into the gold medal position.  The next competitor was the number one thrower in 2016, Thomas Röhler who answered with an 87.40 m to move into silver position.  On his second attempt, Walcott threw it 85.38 to move into bronze position by just 6 cm, still more than 3 metres short of the mark he threw in the qualifying round.  Nobody was able to improve in the next two rounds.  As the final thrower in the fourth round, Yego twisted his left ankle during his fouled attempt.  He limped to the bench and was wheelchair out of the stadium still in gold medal position.  On his fifth attempt, Röhler threw it , less than a foot short of the Olympic record, to move ahead of Yego.  Nobody was able to improve their position in the final round and the gold medal was confirmed.  After treatment, Yego limped back into the stadium to congratulate Röhler and celebrate his silver medal by limping around his victory lap.

The medals for the competition were presented by Richard Peterkin, St. Lucia, Member of the International Olympic Committee, and the gifts were presented by Antti Pihlakoski, IAAF Council Member.

Competition format
Each athlete received three throws in the qualifying round. The nine athletes who achieved the qualifying distance progressed to the final. A further three athletes who did not achieve the qualifying distance also advanced to the final. All twelve starters were allowed three throws in the final, with the top eight athletes after that point receiving three further attempts.

Schedule
All times are Brasilia Time (UTC-3)

Records
, the existing World and Olympic records were as follows.

Results

Qualifying round
Qualification rule: qualification standard 83.00m (Q) or at least best 12 qualified (q).

Final 

* – Julius Yego retired from the competition after his fourth throw due to an ankle injury, but nevertheless won silver due to his first throw.

References

Men's javelin throw
2016
Men's events at the 2016 Summer Olympics